Shilu was a chieftain of the Wanyan tribe, the most dominant among the Jurchen tribes which later founded the Jin dynasty (1115–1234). He was the eldest son of Suike. He was appointed chieftain of the Wanyan tribe by the Khitan-led Liao dynasty, which ruled northern China between the 10th and 11th centuries.

Shilu was posthumously honoured with the temple name Zhaozu (昭祖) by his descendant, Emperor Xizong.

Family
 Father: Suike
 Mother: Suike's primary consort, posthumously honoured as Empress Gongjing (恭靖皇后)
 Spouse: Lady Tushan (徒單氏), posthumously honoured as Empress Weishun (威順皇后), bore Wugunai and Wuguchu
 Concubines:
 Dahumo (達胡末) of the Wusazha (烏薩扎) tribe, bore Tuohei, Pulihei and Woli'an
 Concubine of unknown name, from Goryeo, bore Hushida
 Sons:
 Wugunai, posthumously honoured as Emperor Jingzu
 Wuguchu (烏古出)
 Bahei (跋黑)
 Pulihei (仆里黑)
 Woli'an (斡里安)
 Hushida (胡失答)

References
 

Jurchen rulers